Tracy Wells (born Tracy Anne Brockstein; March 13, 1971 in Encino, California) is an American actress.

Wells is best known for playing Heather Owens on the ABC sitcom Mr. Belvedere (1985–1990). She won the Young Artist Award in the "Best Young Actress Starring in a New Television Series" category for her work on that show.  She was also a guest star on the show Growing Pains. Before Mr. Belvedere, her first primetime TV appearance was on an episode of Silver Spoons as Corliss in the episode "Beauties and the Beasts". She also starred in the movie  The Search, Showtime's Dragstrip Girl, and Mirror, Mirror 2:Raven Dance.

She was married to her husband, Erin Cook, until his death in 2001. They have two children.

She currently is known as Tracy Tofte and a realtor at Keller Williams Westside.

References

External links

American child actresses
American television actresses
American real estate brokers
Living people
1971 births
20th-century American actresses
People from Encino, Los Angeles
Actresses from Los Angeles
21st-century American women